Aporia denotes, in philosophy, a philosophical puzzle or state of puzzlement, and, in rhetoric, a rhetorically useful expression of doubt.

Aporia may also refer to:
 Aporia (butterfly), a genus of pierid butterflies found in the Palearctic region
 Aporia (Forever Never album), an album by metal band Forever Never
 Aporia (Sufjan Stevens and Lowell Brams album), released in 2020